The Interim Constitution of Azad Jammu and Kashmir (Act VIII of 1974) provides for an apparently transitory autonomous parliamentary framework of self-governance and power sharing for the region of Azad Jammu and Kashmir, defined by the act as the "territories of the State of Jammu and Kashmir which have been liberated by the people of that State and for the time being under the administration of Government and such other territories as may hereafter come under its administration", however it does not pertain to areas such as Gilgit, Hunza and Baltistan. The act succeeded and re-enacted the Azad Jammu and Kashmir Government Act, 1970 with modifications. It was promulgated under the Prime Minister of Pakistan Zulfiqar Ali Bhutto. The constitution has been amended 14 times. It is based on the 1973 Constitution of Pakistan.

The parliamentary system introduced a Prime Minister of Azad Kashmir as head of the government responsible for the executive power. The Prime Minister of Pakistan was to head the Azad Jammu and Kashmir Council. The Council had jurisdiction over most of the legislative functioning, including executive authority over them. Following the 13th amendment in 2018, the powers of the Council were transferred to the AJK Assembly and Pakistan government, leaving it with an advisory role. The amendment also removed importance given to the usage of the word "Act".

The Interim Constitution, along with the Karachi Agreement, Simla Agreement and United Nations Commission for India and Pakistan resolutions, form the legal connection between Pakistan and AJK., apart from the practical connection over the decades.

History 
An ordinance in 1950 "Rules of Business of Azad Kashmir Government 1950" vested powers in a "Supreme" head of state. Two years later the rules of business were re-constituted, this time vesting powers in the Joint Secretary of the Ministry of Kashmir Affairs, a ministry of the government of Pakistan. In 1958 this was changed to "Chief Advisor". In 1960, inspired by the "basic democracy" system of Pakistan, an act was passed Kashmir Basic Democracies Act, 1960. This was amended in 1964, 1967, 1968.

Until 1970, the administration of Azad Kashmir (AJK) was guided by a number of provisional orders. The governing power lay with bureaucrats in the Ministry of Kashmir Affairs, a ministry of the government of Pakistan. In 1973 Pakistan got a new constitution. Subsequently, similar demands were made for AJK. The draft was introduced in the Legislative Assembly of AJK  on 24 August 1974. It was passed without any deliberations in the assembly.

Preamble 
The preamble mentions that the 1974 constitution is successive legislation, and references the Kashmir dispute, UN mediation of the conflict, expression of self-determination through a plebiscite, Islam and the Quran. The 13th Amendment of the Constitution introduces two new paragraphs into the constitution. However, with regard to self-determination, Section 7(2) of the Interim Constitution disallows any activity that goes against the accession of AJK to Pakistan.

About 
The Constitution provides for the creation of the following— President, Prime Minister, Council of Ministers, Legislature, Council, High Court, Supreme Court, Chief Election Commissioner, Auditor General, Council of Islamic Ideology.

 Government of Azad Kashmir
 President of Azad Kashmir
 Prime Minister of Azad Kashmir
 Azad Jammu and Kashmir Legislative Assembly
 High Court of Azad Jammu and Kashmir
 Supreme Court of Azad Jammu and Kashmir
 Azad Jammu & Kashmir Election Commission
 Auditor General of Azad Kashmir
 Council of Islamic Ideology of Azad Kashmir
As per the constitution, AJK has its own flag and national anthem. For the purpose of this constitution, it does not pertain to the northern areas of the former state of Jammu and Kashmir.

The act provided for two executive branches, the AJK Government, and the AJK Council. The Council was based in Islamabad and was chaired by the Prime Minister of Pakistan. The Council had jurisdiction over 52 subjects including nuclear energy, aircraft, copyright, banking, insurance, stock-exchanges, census, railways, oil and gas, electricity, press, education and tourism. As per the 13th amendment in 2018, the council stands largely abolished, with only advisory powers remaining.

Amendments

See also
 Constitution of Jammu and Kashmir

References and notes 
Notes

Citations

Bibliography

Further reading 
 
 

Government of Azad Kashmir